A Boss in the Living Room (also known as A Boss in the Kitchen) is a 2014 Italian comedy film written and  directed by Luca Miniero.

It was a box office hit, grossing over 12 million euros and being the best-grossing Italian film of 2014.

Plot 
Cristina is a woman from Naples who lives for years in Bolzano, with her husband Michele. Their love life is very quiet, but a day arrives Ciro, Cristina's brother: a boxwood mobster on the run from the law. 
The brother makes life very difficult for the Italian family as he dominates the house. Eventually the family likes the brother as he solves their problems with his criminal mind.

Cast

References

External links 

2014 films
2010s crime comedy films
Italian crime comedy films
Films directed by Luca Miniero
2010s Italian-language films
2010s Italian films